A turban (from Persian دولبند‌, dulband; via Middle French turbant) is a type of headwear based on cloth winding. Featuring many variations, it is worn as customary headwear by people of various cultures. Communities with prominent turban-wearing traditions can be found in the Indian subcontinent, Southeast Asia, the Arabian Peninsula, the Middle East, the Balkans, the Caucasus, Central Asia, North Africa, West Africa, East Africa, and amongst some Turkic peoples in Russia as well as Ashkenazi Jews.

A keski is a type of turban, a long piece of cloth roughly half the length of a traditional "single turban", but not cut and sewn to make a double-width "Double Turban" (or Double Patti).

Wearing turbans is common among Sikh men, and infrequently women. They are also worn by Hindu monks. The headgear also serves as a religious observance, including among Shia Muslims, who regard turban-wearing as Sunnah mu’akkadah (confirmed tradition). The turban is also the traditional headdress of Sufi scholars. Additionally, turbans have often been worn by nobility, regardless of religious background.

History

The origins of turbans are uncertain. Some of the ancient civilizations such as those of Ancient India, Mesopotamia, Sumerian, and Babylonian evidently used turbans. A style of turban called a phakeolis continued to be worn in that region by soldiers of the Byzantine army in the period 400–600, as well as by Byzantine civilians as depicted in Greek frescoes from the 10th century in the province of Cappadocia in modern Turkey, where it was still worn by their Greek-speaking descendants in the early 20th century. The Islamic prophet, Muhammad, who lived 570–632, wore a turban in white, the most holy colour. The style of turban he introduced was a cap with a cloth tied around it; this headwear is known as Imamah and was emulated by Muslim kings and scholars throughout history. Shiah clergies today wear white turbans unless they are descendants of prophet Muhammad or Sayyid, in which case they wear a black turban. Many Muslim men choose to wear green, because it represents paradise, especially among followers of Sufism. In parts of North Africa, where blue is common, the shade of a turban can signify the tribe of the wearer.

National styles

Contemporary turbans come in many shapes, sizes and colours. Turban wearers in North Africa, the Horn of Africa, the Middle East, Central Asia, South Asia, and Philippines (Sulu) usually wind it anew for each wearing, using long strips of cloth. The cloth is usually under five meters in length. Some elaborate South Asian turbans may also be permanently formed and sewn to a foundation. Turbans can be very large or quite modest depending upon region, culture, and religion.

East Africa
Turbans are commonly worn in East Africa by Muslim clerics, as well as Ethiopian Orthodox Christian priests. The headwrap has a long presence in the region, where it was frequently sported by Sultans, Wazirs, and other aristocratic and court officials. Among these nobles are the Somali Sultans Deria Hassan of the Isaaq Sultanate, Mohamoud Ali Shire of the Warsangali, Osman Mahamuud of the Majeerteen Sultanate, and Yusuf Ali Kenadid and Ali Yusuf Kenadid of the Sultanate of Hobyo. Prominent historical Islamic leaders in the region that are known to have worn turbans include Sheikh Abadir Umar Ar-Rida. It is typically worn with a maccawiis (sarong) or a jellabiya.

Among Tumbuka nobility in Malawi and Zambia, black turbans (mphumphu) in various styles are worn by the king chikulamayembe and all chiefs below him. These turbans thus function as crowns. The practice of Tumbuka nobles wearing black turbans dates back to the late 18th century when a Swahili/Nyamwezi trades man gifted all chiefs he encouraged in the tumbuka territories black cloth, some of which he would wrap around their heads.

Arabian Peninsula

In most countries of the Arabian peninsula, a plain or checkered scarf (called ghutrah,  shumagh or chefiyah), not usually described as a turban is often worn, though the Arabic Emamah tradition remains strong in Oman (see Sultan Qaboos of Oman), Sudan and some parts of the Arabian peninsula. The colored turban, Ghabanah, is a common inherited cultural turban in the regions of Hijaz, and it still the inhabitants costume of Mecca, Madinah and Jeddah in particular. Ghabanah is the heritage uniform headwear for traders and the general community categories of the prestigious and middle-class, with the exception of religious scholars who have had their special turbans distinctiveness predominately white. The Hijazi turbans with different shapes are the extension of the turban of Islamic prophet Muhammad who lived in Mecca and Madinah. There are several types of Ghabanah, perhaps the most famous is the yellow (Halabi), that made in Aleppo, that characterized by different inscriptions, and wrapped on a dome-like hollow taqiyah or a Turkish fez or kalpak cap. Colorful turbans called Masar are the national headwear costume in Oman, and also are common in some regions in south of Yemen and Hadhramaut. Moreover, the white ghutrah or shumagh are commonly wrapped in Hamdaniyah style, which is also the shape of turbans in the United Arab Emirates.

Afghanistan

Turbans are part of the national dress in Afghanistan. They are used more widely than elsewhere in the Muslim world, and are worn in a wide range of styles and colours. In the country's south-east, turbans are wrapped loosely and largely, whereas in Kabul the garment tends to be smaller and tighter. In traditional Afghan society, a related piece of extra cloth called a patu serves practical purposes, such as for wrapping oneself against the cold, to sit on, to tie up an animal or to carry water in the cap. Different ethnic groups in Afghanistan wear different lungees with different patterns, way of styling it, fabric, stripes, lengths and colouration. Males of all ethnic backgrounds generally avoid wearing bright-coloured turbans that draw attention to oneself and prefer wearing simple colors that are white, off white, gray, dark blue and black.

Navy blue is a color common more to the Sikh Nihangs, it signifies war and service, while black is associated with resistance, orange with sacrifice and martyrdom, and white with wisdom, old age, death, or peace; however during times of peace, or rallies for peace, people will usually be in war gear, blue. It is also traditionally worn by members of the Taliban.

Bangladesh

In Bangladesh, the turban is known as pagri, or fagri in Chittagong and Sylhet. The pagri is worn by religious leaders and preachers of Islam. The most common colour worn is white, and generally it is the Sufis that wear green turbans. It is also worn by elders in rural areas as a symbol of honour and respect.

Myanmar

In Myanmar, the turban is referred to as a gaung baung. There are several regional styles worn.

Malaysia

In Malaysia, the serban is used to refer to both the Sikh gear and those worn by certain Muslim clerics.

India

In India, the turban is referred to as a pagri, meaning the headdress that is worn by men and is manually tied. There are several styles, which are specific to the wearer's region or religion, and they vary in shape, size and colour. For example, the Mysore Peta, the Marathi pheta, Puneri Pagadi. The pagri is a symbol of honour and respect everywhere it is worn. It is a common practice to honour important guests by offering them one to wear.

Colours are often chosen to suit the occasion or circumstance: for example saffron, associated with valour or sacrifice (martyrdom), is worn during rallies; white, associated with peace, is worn by elders; and pink, associated with spring, is worn during that season or for marriage ceremonies.

During World War II, some soldiers in the Indian Army were required to wear a turban.

Indonesia

In Indonesia, the turban-styled headdress for men is traditionally called iket  (from Javanese and Sundanese language). It literally means 'to tie', the main way to attach the fabric over the head of the wearer. It is made of a square or rectangular batik cloth that is folded diagonally to form a triangle. Although there are different ways of folding and tying the fabric over the head, and therefore different shapes of iket, they can in general show the social level of the wearer and the area of origin. Its origin is not yet clearly identified, however many sources seemed to conclude that the Javanese might be influenced by turban-wearing Gujarati traders who came to Indonesia more than 500 years ago.

In other parts of Java, for practicality the iket has developed into fixed-form headdresses, called blangkon in Central Java and Yogyakarta and bendo in West Java. In East Java and Bali, the headdress is still made in traditional way and it is called udeng. The batik cloth is made stiff through a process of molding, attaching to stiff paper, and sewing. Similar to iket, blangkon and bendo come with some variations of shapes based on the areas of origin and the wearer's social rank.

Nepal

The turban in Nepal is commonly worn in rural areas by males. The rural turban is called either a Pagdi or Pheta. It is common among farmers. All types of coloured clothes were used for Pheta. Historically, Gorkhali nobleman used to wear white turban called Shirpau awarded by the King of Nepal. For example; Sardar Ram Krishna Kunwar was awarded with 22 pairs of headgear called Shirpau by the Gorkhali monarch Maharajadhiraj Prithvi Narayan Shah. It was common among aristocrats in other contemporary kingdoms. Rulers and vassal lords also adapted a crest to the white turban.

Pakistan

In Pakistan, the turban is in widespread use, especially among the rural population. It is worn in different styles and colours across the country, varying by region, e.g. in the north of the country, black and white turbans are preferred. The turban most commonly found in Pakistan is white and crestless, and worn commonly in the Pashtun belt, while in rural Punjab and Sindh, it is mostly worn by elders or feudal lords. The turban is called either a pagri or pag by Punjabis, while the Pashtuns and Sindhi's call it patkay/patko.

The Baloch people are famous for their large turbans that are worn with both ends hanging from the sides or as a loop that rests above the chest. These turbans are made with many feet of cloth that are wrapped around a cap and are mostly made with white cloth.

United Kingdom

In the United Kingdom, turbans have been worn by men and women since the sixth century without ever becoming very common. Poet Alexander Pope is sometimes depicted wearing a turban, as were other notable men seen in contemporary paintings and illustrations. The common use of turbans on less formal occasions, among gentlemen at the time, reflects that their heads were closely cropped, or shaved, to allow the wearing of the elaborate wigs that were the fashion in Europe in the century from about 1650 to 1750, and when wigs were off, some kind of head cover was useful. Hence, the turban.

Now that hats are infrequently worn, turbans too are relatively uncommon. They are worn primarily by women of West Indian descent, Karinas. Some women wear them to make a statement of individuality, such as the British social entrepreneur Camila Batmanghelidjh, who usually wears a colourful matching turban and robe.

Greece
In Greece, specifically the island of Crete, the men traditionally wear a turban known as a sariki. The headwrap's name is borrowed from sarık, the Turkish word for turban. Today, it may be more commonly known as a kritiko mandili (Cretan kerchief). It is not found commonly amongst the younger generation, but mostly worn by older men in remoter, mountainous villages.

Fiji

iTaukei indigenous chiefs and priests were known to have worn masi (barkcloth) coverings around their head similar to a turban, called an i-sala. However, most of the bulk and shape of the i-sala came from the bushy hair under the cloth.

Philippines
In the Philippines, the turban has a long history associated with native Austronesian (Malayo-Polynesian) cultures, and reinforced with significant cultural influences from the rest of Maritime Southeast Asia (especially Java, Borneo and Sumatra), India, Arabia, China, and Persia, through the different epochs of Philippine history.

The most common turban worn by Muslim Filipino women is called the kombong, the traditional style of hijab by Muslim women in the Davao area of Mindanao (associated with Maranao, Maguindanao, and Iranun speakers). The kombong is worn as a headwrap-turban, and is paired with the tudong or headscarf, which is ordinarily draped over the chest or shoulder, but worn over the top of the kombong for Islamic prayer, or for providing extra veiling when out of the house or barangay. A white kombong signifies that its wearer has been on the pilgrimage to Makkah, known as Hajj. The wearer of the white kombong will hence be referred to as Hadja, a title given to any Muslim woman who has been on the Hajj.

For men, the most common turban worn is called a putong, potong or pudong. The putong was historically worn by men of nearly all major ethnolinguisitc groups in the country, such as the Bisaya, Tagalog and Ilocano, before the mid-17th century, but had waned in lieu of the western hat since the coming of Catholicism in the north and subsequent colonization under Spanish and then American rule. In the precolonial period, pudong were dyed into different distinct colors to signify the social caste of its wearer. Blue was worn for the maginoo nobility class only, red putong for the maharlika warrior class, and other colors like yellow or natural hue for the timawa freeman/raiding caste, and alipin slave castes, respectively.

Today, the turban is worn primarily by Muslim Filipino men, especially by Imams and members of the ulama (Islamic scholars), but is also worn by non-Muslim groups too. Among Muslims, the putong can signify the status of its wearer. Muslim men and imams who have been on the Hajj pilgrimage have traditionally opted to wear the keffiyeh as a putong instead. This is usually bought in Saudi Arabia before returning to the Philippines, in order to signify that they are Hajji. This practice has waned in recent years due to younger jihadist militant groups in the south of the country using keffiyeh as signifiers that they are members of the extremist takfiri groups.

The pre-colonial item of clothing is also worn by non-Muslim Lumad and Cordilleran chiefs and upper class individuals in times of celebration or for specific rituals. These putong or turbans can be ornately women or designed, and act as a status symbol for the wearer.

In the southern part of the country, in the Sulu archipelago, Tausug and Yakan men wear the pis syabit, an ornate headscarf worn in a manner similar to a turban or bandana. Larger pis syabit are turban like, whereas smaller pis resemble bandanas. As with the other putong found in the Philippines, the size or visual design of the pis indicates the social-status or caste of its wearer.

On some Babuyan islands in the far north of the country, the head of the household wears a white turban, the younger males wear a red turban after their 13th birthday. The three chiefs all wear yellow turbans. It no longer has religious significance and the origin dates back to the end of the Tondo era (circa 900s – 1589). Most Babuyan settlers fled the Philippines in 1589 when Spain began to invade the Philippines. The turban was made from a type of bark cloth but now is made from cotton or silk brought over from the Philippines mainland. The turban style head dress is then cut and wrapped around the head, then tucked in front.

Vietnam 

Alongside a variety of hats, turbans were also worn by the majority ethnic Vietnamese, called khăn vấn or khăn đóng in Vietnamese. Initially, they were pieces of fabric that had to be coiled every time, but starting in the 20th century, they were replaced with ready-to-wear versions already coiled. Similar turbans are worn by surrounding ethnic groups in Northern Vietnam and Southern China, such as the Zhuang, Hmong, and Yi people. Turbans are also common amongst many ethnic groups in other parts of Southeast Asia and Northeast Asia.

Armenia
Much of Armenia's traditions and cultures reflect Middle Eastern origins. Though not common in daily apparel, turbans are sometimes worn by men ceremonially (often with beards), as a symbol of national identity during celebrations and festivals.  However, before Armenia became a Christian nation, turbans were a common part of the daily apparel, just as in other Middle Eastern countries.

Other
On the Swahili Coast, turbans were frequently worn by the ruling Omani Sultans of Zanzibar and their retinue.

Tuareg Berbers, and some northern Berbers, Sahrawi, Songhai, Wodaabe, Fulani, and Hausa peoples of North and West Africa wear varieties of turbans. Tuareg Berbers often veil the face to block dust. This Tuareg-Berber turban is known as a tagelmust, and is often blue. The Bedouin tribes in North Africa sometimes wear brown-beige, white or orange turbans.
Colombian politician Piedad Cordoba is known to wear turbans (or a similar headgear). Her use of turbans has made her so distinguishable to the point of having earned the nickname "the lady with the turban" in Colombian popular culture.

Kurdish people wear a turban, which they call a jamadani. It is worn in many different ways across Iraqi Kurdistan depending on the style of the locality; e.g. the Barzani Kurds are a tribe which wears the turban in a colour (red and white) and style which is typical of their clan. In most parts of South Kurdistan a black-white pattern is used for Jamadani. Mostly, Kurdish turbans consist of a length of striped cloth known as kolāḡī which is wound around a conical hat; the tassels that border the kolāḡī are allowed to hang down over the face. In modern times, many Kurds use black and white Ghutra and roll them into turbans.

Turbans have also been a type of headwear worn by women in Western countries. The wearing of such turbans by women in Western societies is less common than it was earlier in the 20th century. They are usually sewn to a foundation, so that they can be donned or removed easily. Turbans are also sometimes donned to protect hair or as a headwrap for women following cancer treatments that cause hair loss. They can also be tied together to form a rope in emergency rescue situations.

In religion

Christianity

In Kenya, the Akurinu, a Christian denomination, wear turbans as religious headgear. The official name of the denomination is The Kenya Foundation Of The Prophets Church or else Holy Ghost Church. Both men and women wear white turbans; children wear tunics. Some Oriental Orthodox churches such as the Coptic Orthodox Church and the Syriac Orthodox Church include turbans in the vestments for the priest.

Islam
In Islamic cultures, some men wear a turban-style headdress in emulation of Muhammad who is believed to have worn a black or white turban. The head wraps are worn in different ways and called by different names depending on the region and culture. Examples include ( `emãmah) in Arabic, and the Dastar in Persian.

In Shi'a Islam, a black head wrap around a small white cap is worn by descendants of Muhammad called Sayyids, and white turbans by other well-educated persons and scholars. Sufi Muslims often wear a green head wrap around a small cap or the green head wrap alone.  Members of the Dawat-e-Islami movement wear green turbans, whereas members of Sunni Dawate Islami (which broke away from Dawat-e-Islami in 1992) wear white turbans.

In Sudan, large white headdresses connote high social status.  In India and Pakistan the cap is called a topi. Women of Islam typically do not wear turbans, as it is typically considered part of a man's dress, while women do typically cover their hair as part of hijab.

However, just as some Muslim women wear no headcovering, some modern Muslim women wear a turban style covering. Although it is still not as widely accepted by the more conservative Islamic communities.

Judaism

When the Jewish High Priest served in the Tabernacle and the Temple in Jerusalem, he wore a head covering called mitznefet מִצְנֶפֶת. This word has been translated as mitre (KJV) or headdress. It was most likely a turban, as the word comes from a root meaning 'to wrap'.

In the Hebrew Bible, the turban worn by the High Priest was much larger than the head coverings of the priests and wound to make a broad, flat-topped shape resembling the blossom of a flower. The head covering of the priests was different, being wound to form a cone, called a migbahat.

The priestly crown (Hebrew tzitz צִיץ "blossom", "flower") was attached to the turban by means of two sets of blue cords: one going over the top of the head and the other around the sides of the head at the level of the ears (Exodus 39:31).

According to the Talmud, the wearing of the turban atoned for the sin of haughtiness on the part of the Children of Israel (B. Zevachim 88b).

The Jews who lived under Arab rule during the Middle Ages, notably in Islamic Spain, wore turbans and headwear not too different from their Muslim counterparts.

Some married Jewish women wear mitpaḥats as an act of modesty.

Mandaeism 

Mandaean priests wear white turbans called burzinqa.

Hinduism 
In Hinduism, many Rajputs wear it due to culture. It is a cultural practice driven by the harsh summer months in India especially in the state of Rajasthan. It is also worn by the Gujjars of Rajasthan. Apart from turban; there are several other headgears and also different types of turbans used in different parts of India and people wear them when going out especially in villages.

Rastafari
Members of the Bobo Ashanti mansion of the Rastafari movement keep their hair and beards, mainly with their hair in dreadlocks, and they have been wearing turbans over their dreadlocks, which are not to be removed publicly or even not at all, so as to protect and keep their dreadlocks clean. Along with the turban, they have also been wearing robes since their founding in the 1950s, Since they are a relatively small population, it makes them more distinctive in appearance in Jamaica and elsewhere.

Sikhism

The Sikh turban, known as the Dastar or a Dumalla, is used to show others that they represent the embodiment of Sikh teachings, the love of the Guru and dogma to do good deeds. The Gurus ensured that both men and women are able to wear a turban, which shows another action of equality. Other Purposes of the turban include protecting Sikhs' long unshorn hair and keeping it clean.

Sikhs do not cut their hair, as a religious observance. The turban protects the hair and keeps it clean. As Sikhs form 1.7% of India's population and 1.5% of Canada's population, their turbans help identify them. When he institutionalized the turban as a part of the Sikh identity, Guru Gobind Singh said, "My Sikh will be recognized among millions".

Turbans were formerly associated with the upper class, and many men in the cultural elite still wear turbans. This distinction between the turban-wearing upper class (Sardars) and commoners promoted segregation and elitism. In order to eliminate the class system associated with turbans, Guru Gobind Singh declared each and every Sikh a Sardar.

Modern Sikh men mainly wear four kinds of Turban- Vattan Wali Turban, Amritsar Shahi Turban, Barnala Shahi and Taksali Dumala. The more traditional Turban styles are the Darbara Singh Dummala, Dastar Bunga (the original turban of the Khalsa) and the Puratan Nok Pagg.

The most common turban colors worn by Sikhs are blue, white and black, although other colors are very popular as well. Blue and yellow are particularly prestigious and tend to be worn on religious events such as Vaisakhi. Meanings of the turbans are that the white turban means a saintly person leading an exemplary life, and an off-shade color of white means someone is learning in the Sikh religion. The blue turban signifies a mind as broad as the sky with no place for prejudice. The black turban serves as a reminder of the Jallianwala Bagh massacre in 1919, and represents humility. The Basanti or yellow turbans are associated with the revolutionary movement, Sardar Bhagat Singh also wore a yellow turban for this reason. Royal blue is usually worn by those who are learned in the Sikh religion and are patriotic about their traditions and culture. The colour green signifies farmers. The orange turban means courage and wisdom. The colour Gold symbolizes a sense of calm and healing that helps with anxiety and clearing the mind which significance derives from the Golden temple.
Akali Nihang Sikhs decorate their blue turbans or Dumalla by wearing small weapons known as shastars in them. The turban's color may reflect association with a particular group of Sikhs, although none of the popular turban colors are exclusive to any particular group. The preferred color of the Sikh wedding is pink. All shades of this color from magenta to baby pink is used by families for the joyful occasion. Some prefer red, maroon or orange turbans for the weddings, but pink is so far the most popular. Turban colors are generally a matter of personal choice in Sikhism, with many Sikh men choosing colors based on fashion or taste, sometimes to match clothes. There are traditions associated with some colours, for instance orange and black are often worn at political protest rallies whilst red and pink turbans are worn at weddings and other celebratory events.

See also
Turban training centre

References

External links

Why Sikhs wear a turban
Sikh Fortress Turban
Tutorial on how to make a Turban (Pagri)
Information on why Sikhs wear Turbans
Understanding Turbans
Significance of Turban Infographic
Largest Turbon of Shivaji Maharaj World Records India

Arabic clothing
Bangladeshi clothing
Headgear
History of Asian clothing
Indian headgear
Iranian clothing
Islamic male clothing
Middle Eastern clothing
Ottoman clothing
Religious headgear
Sikh religious clothing

Turkish clothing